Nicholas John Pugliese (born September 18, 1985) is a professional baseball pitcher, for the Fortitudo Baseball Bologna in the Italian Baseball League 
Pugliese attended Stetson University and signed as an undrafted free agent with the Los Angeles Angels of Anaheim. The Angels released him in 2011 and he joined the IBL. 
He also played for the Italy national baseball team in the 2011 Baseball World Cup, the 2013 World Baseball Classic, and the 2019 European Baseball Championship

References

External links

1985 births
2013 World Baseball Classic players
2016 European Baseball Championship players
Arizona League Angels players
Arkansas Travelers players
Baseball pitchers
Baseball players from Connecticut
Cedar Rapids Kernels players
Inland Empire 66ers of San Bernardino players
Living people
Rancho Cucamonga Quakes players
Stetson Hatters baseball players